McClary Ridge is a small, crescent-shaped ridge  south-southeast of Mount Hayes on the south side of Cole Peninsula in Graham Land, Antarctica. In December 1947 it was charted by the Falkland Islands Dependencies Survey and was photographed from the air by the Ronne Antarctic Research Expedition under Finn Ronne. It was named by Ronne for George B. McClary of Winnetka, Illinois, a contributor to the expedition.

References

External links

Ridges of Graham Land
Foyn Coast